
This is an alphabetical index of people, places, things, and concepts related to or originating from the Sasanian Empire (224–651). Feel free to add more, and create missing pages.

A

  Aba I
  Abarsam
  Abdon and Sennen
  Adarmahan
  Adergoudounbades
  Adhar Valash
  Adhur Gushnasp
  Adi ibn Zayd
  Adur-Anahid
  Adurfrazgird
  Afrig
  Ahudemmeh
  Amargar
  Amazasp III of Iberia
  Anak the Parthian
  Anastasian War
  Anastasius of Persia
  Andarzaghar
  Anoshazad
  Antiochus (praepositus sacri cubiculi)
  Aparviz of Sakastan
  Aphrahat
  Apranik
  Apursam-Shapur
  Ardashir I
  Ardashir II
  Ardashir III
  Ardashir (king of Marv)
  Ardashir I Kushanshah
  Arsacid dynasty of Caucasian Albania
  Arvand Gushnasp
  Ashtat Yeztayar
  Aspacures I of Iberia
  Aspad Gushnasp
  Aswagen
  Ayadgar-i Zariran
  Azadbeh
  Azad Peroz
  Azarethes
  Azarmidokht
  Azen Gushnasp

B

  Babak (Sasanian officer)
  Baduspanids
  Bahram I
  Bahram II
  Bahram III
  Bahram IV
  Bahram V
  Bahram Chobin
  Bahram Gushnasp
  Balendukht
  Balkh
  Barzabod
  Boran
  Bozorgmehr

C

  Chihor-Vishnasp
  Ctesiphon

D

  Dabuyid dynasty
  Drustbed

E

  Eulamius

F

  Farn-Sasan

G

  Gubazes II of Lazica

H

  Herat
  Hormizd I
  Hormizd II
  Hormizd III
  Hormizd IV

I

  Iberia (Caucasus)
  Iberia, Principate of
  Iberia, Sasanian
  Iberian War
  Ispahbudhan, House of
  Istakhr
  Izadgushasp

J

  Julian (emperor)
  Justinian I

K

  Karen, House of
  Kavad I
  King of Kings
  Klimova Treasure
  Korymbos
  Kushano-Sasanian Kingdom
  Khwaday-Namag

L

  Lakhmids
  Lazica
  Lazic War

M

  Mahbod (envoy)
  Maskut
  Maurice (emperor)
  Mihr-Mihroe
  Mihran, House of
  Mihranids of Gugark
  Mirian III of Iberia
  Mushegh I Mamikonian

N

  Nabedes
  Nachoragan
  Nahrawan Canal

O

  Ostandar

P

  Parthian Empire
  Peroz I
  Peroz I Kushanshah
  Persecution of Zoroastrians
  Persis, Kings of
  Phocas

Q

  Qazvin
  Qumis

R

  Ray

S

  Šahrestānīhā ī Ērānšahr
  Sagdukht
  Sasanian dress
  Sasanian economy
  Sasanian roads
  Sebukht
  Shahrbaraz
  Shapur III
  Sogdia
  Stephen I of Iberia
  Suren, House of

T

  Tammisha
  Tawwaj

U

V

  Vahan Mamikonian
  Vakhtang I of Iberia
  Valerian (emperor)
  Varsken

W

  Wahrez

X

Y

  Yazdegerd I
  Yazdegerd II

Z

  Zanjan
  Zoarab

See also
 Index of Byzantine Empire–related articles

Sasanian Empire
Sasanian Empire
Sasanian Empire